NXT is an open source cryptocurrency and payment network launched in 2013 by anonymous software developer BCNext. It uses proof-of-stake to reach consensus for transactions—as such, there is a static money supply. Unlike Bitcoin, there is no mining. NXT was specifically conceived as a flexible platform around build applications and financial services, and serves as basis for ARDR (Ardor), a blockchain-as-a-service multichain platform developed by Jelurida, and IoTeX (cryptocurrency) the current steward of NXT as of 2021. NXT has been covered extensively in the "Call for Evidence" report by ESMA.

History 
NXT was created with a total of one billion coins. On 28 September 2013, Bitcointalk.org member BCNext created a forum thread announcing the proposed launch of NXT as a second generation cryptocurrency and asked for small bitcoin donations to determine how to distribute the initial stake. On 18 November 2013, fundraising for NXT was closed.

The initial coin offering collected 21 bitcoins that were worth US$17,000.

In July 2016, NXT launched Smart Transaction templates, which were meant to serve as building blocks for businesses to construct Blockchain solutions for particular problems.

Features 
The core infrastructure of NXT is complex, which, compared to the leaner and simpler Bitcoin, creates more potential for flaws or mistakes. However, this allows third parties to contribute to the blockchain with ease.

NXT's Asset Exchange is a peer-to-peer exchange allowing decentralized trading of shares and crypto assets. Since the blockchain is an unalterable public ledger of transactions, it can provide a trading record for items other than NXT. To do this, NXT allows the designation or "coloring" of a particular coin, which builds a bridge from the virtual cryptocurrency world to the physical world. The "colored coin" can represent property, stocks/bonds, commodities, or even concepts.

NXT has Arbitrary Messages which can be used to send encrypted or plain text as well as data (up to 1000 bytes of data permanently or 42 kilobytes of data for a limited amount of time). As a result, it can be used to build file-sharing services, decentralized applications, and higher-level NXT services.

NXT allows the holders of the currency or NXT-Assets to vote in a cryptographically proven and externally verifiable way. This can be used for deciding on future development decisions or for shareholder voting, and It can also be applied to public elections and community-based decision-making.

NXT Plugins allow external developers to add features or usability enhancements. The plug-ins are not contained in a sandbox.

See also
 Peer-to-peer computing

References

External links 

 

Cryptocurrency projects
Free software programmed in Java (programming language)
Currencies introduced in 2013
2013 software
Financial technology
Darknet markets